The Chicago Auto Show is held annually in February at Chicago's McCormick Place
convention center. It is the largest auto show in North America.

History 
Samuel Miles, formerly a promoter of bicycle shows, produced the first "official" Chicago Automobile Show in 1901. The event was staged in March of that year at the third Chicago Coliseum located at 1513 S. Wabash Avenue. The 1901 show featured an indoor track for attendees to test drive the ten vehicles exhibited: five electric powered, three steam powered, and two with gasoline engines. The 1902 show saw 100 cars on display; the indoor track was discontinued after the first year to accommodate space requirements for the exhibitors.

By the late 1920s, the automotive industry's maturation resulted in many smaller automobile manufacturers being acquired or replaced by larger ones. The Chicago Auto Show continued to gain prominence during this era and was often regarded as the "National Auto Show". Samuel Miles retired as the Chicago Auto Show's general manager in 1931 after three decades of service.

1935 was characterized by three major changes to the Chicago Auto Show: The Chicago Automobile Trade Association (CATA), the United States' oldest and largest metropolitan automobile dealership organization, became the event's producer and organizer. Also, the show was held twice in calendar year 1935—once in January for the 1935 models, and once in November for the 1936 models. This arrangement was a result of automakers shifting the start of the model year to the fall, based on a recommendation by President Franklin Delano Roosevelt to advance the introduction of new automobile models by two months. Finally, the November 1935 show moved to a much larger venue, the International Amphitheatre located at 4220 South Halsted Street.

World War II curtailed production of motor vehicles for consumers in the United States, with the domestic automotive industry retooling to manufacture defense and military equipment. As a result, the Chicago Auto Show was not held between 1941 and 1949.

In 1961, the Chicago Auto Show moved from the International Amphitheatre to the original McCormick Place. The latter facility was destroyed by fire just a month prior to the 1967 show, so the International Amphitheatre resumed its role as the Chicago Auto Show's venue between 1967 and 1970. The show returned to McCormick Place in 1971, when a replacement building was constructed at the site. Additional expansions to McCormick Place toward the end of the 20th century allowed the Chicago Auto Show to become the largest auto show in the United States. The event currently encompasses more than 1 million square feet in the North and South exhibit halls of McCormick Place.
 
Due to the vast amount of space available, several auto manufacturers have implemented creative uses of their exhibit area in recent years. For example, FCA US, Toyota, and Volkswagen have all configured indoor test track experiences adjacent to their respective vehicle displays.

In 2021, CATA received approval to host a special summer edition of the Chicago Auto Show in the West Building of McCormick Place, supplemented by outdoor activities such as test drives and technology demonstrations.

2023
The 2023 Chicago Auto Show was held from February 11 through February 20, with press preview starting on February 9 and the "First Look For Charity" Gala taking place on February 10.

Production car introductions

 2024 Chevrolet Corvette E-Ray* 
 2024 Chevrolet Trailblazer (refresh) 
 2023 Jeep Wrangler Rubicon 20th Anniversary Edition 
 2024 Subaru Crosstrek (US debut) 
 2024 Toyota Grand Highlander
 2024 Volkswagen Atlas/Atlas Cross Sport (refresh)

Concept car introductions
 Ram 1500 Revolution BEV concept*

* auto show debut

2022
The 2022 Chicago Auto Show was held from February 12 through February 21, with press preview starting on February 10 and the "First Look For Charity" Gala taking place on February 11.

Production car introductions

 2023 BMW iX M60* 
 2023 Chevrolet Blazer (refresh)
 2022 Ford Bronco Everglades 
 2022 Ford Bronco Raptor* 
 2022 Ford GT Alan Mann Heritage Edition 
 2022 Jeep Grand Cherokee L Limited Black Package 
 2023 Kia Sportage PHEV
 2022 Ram 1500 "Built to Serve" Firefighter edition 
 2023 Toyota Sequoia* 
 2022 Toyota Tundra Capstone* 

* auto show debut

Concept car introductions

 Nissan Frontier Project 72X, Project Hardbody, and Project Adventure

2021
The 2021 Chicago Auto Show was held from July 15 through July 19. The press preview and the "First Look For Charity" Gala events held in previous years were not part of the 2021 show.

Production car introductions

 2022 BMW iX (North American debut) 
 2022 Chevrolet Traverse (refresh)* 
 2022 Ford F-150 Lightning* 
 2022 Ford Maverick* 
 2022 Jeep Compass (refresh)
 2021 Jeep Wrangler Xtreme Recon Package
 2022 Kia EV6* 
 2022 Lexus IS 500 Performance Launch Edition* 
 2022 Lexus NX* 
 2022 Nissan Frontier* 
 2022 Nissan Pathfinder* 
 2022 Ram 1500 BackCountry Edition
 2022 Ram 1500 Laramie G/T & Rebel G/T
 2022 Ram 1500 Limited 10th Anniversary Edition
 2022 Toyota 4Runner TRD Sport* 
 2022 Toyota Corolla Cross (North American debut)* 
 2022 Toyota GR 86* 
 2022 Toyota Tacoma TRD Pro 3.0, Trail Edition* 
 2022 Volkswagen Golf GTI, Golf R (North American debut)

Concept car introductions
 Nissan Z Proto* 

* auto show debut

2020
The 2020 Chicago Auto Show was held from February 8 through February 17, with press preview starting on February 6 and the "First Look For Charity" Gala taking place on February 7. The 2020 event concluded before government responses to the COVID-19 pandemic in Illinois took effect.

Production car introductions

 2021 Chevrolet Equinox (refresh)
 2021 Chrysler Pacifica (refresh)
 2020 Dodge Durango SRT Black appearance package, redline stripe
 2020 Ford GT (refresh)
 2021 Genesis GV80 (auto show debut)
 2020 Honda Civic Type R (refresh) (US debut)
 2020 Hyundai Sonata Hybrid (North American debut)
 2020 Jaguar F-Type (refresh) (North American debut)
 2020 Jeep Gladiator Mojave, High Altitude
 2020 Jeep Wrangler Mopar JPP edition
 2020 Jeep Wrangler High Altitude, Rubicon Recon
 2020 Kia Cadenza (refresh) (North American debut)
 2020 Mercedes-Benz Metris Weekender camper van
 2020 Nissan Frontier (refresh)
 2021 Toyota Highlander XSE
 2021 Toyota Tacoma, Tundra, Sequoia Nightshade
 2021 Toyota Tacoma, Tundra, 4Runner Trail
 2021 Volkswagen Atlas (refresh)

2019
The 2019 Chicago Auto Show was held from February 9 through February 18, with press preview starting on February 7 and the "First Look For Charity" Gala taking place on February 8. Acura hosted a panel discussion to commemorate the 30th anniversary of the Acura NS-X concept, which debuted at the 1989 Chicago Auto Show.

Production car introductions

2020 Alfa Romeo 4C Spider Italia
2019 Cadillac XT5 Sport package
2020 Chevrolet Silverado HD
2019 Chrysler Pacifica, Dodge Grand Caravan 35th Anniversary Edition
2020 Ford F-Series Super Duty (refresh)
2020 Kia Forte GT-Line
2020 Kia Sportage (refresh)
2019 Lexus LC 500 Inspiration Series
2019 Lexus NX F Sport Black Line Edition
2019 Mazda MX-5 Miata 30th Anniversary Edition
2019 Nissan Pathfinder Rock Creek Edition
2020 Nissan Rogue Sport (refresh)
2019 Ram 1500 with multifunction tailgate
2019 Ram 4500/5500 HD Chassis Cab
2020 Range Rover Evoque (North American debut)
2020 Subaru Legacy
2020 Toyota Land Cruiser Heritage Edition
2020 Toyota RAV4 TRD Off-Road
2020 Toyota Sequoia TRD Pro
2020 Toyota Tacoma (refresh)
2019 Volkswagen Jetta GLI

2018
The 2018 Chicago Auto Show was held from February 10 through February 19, with press days starting on February 8 and First Look For Charity taking place February 9.

Production car introductions

2018 Chevrolet Traverse RS
2018 Dodge Durango SRT with Mopar performance parts
2018 Fiat 500 (U.S. spec refresh)
2019 Ford Edge Titanium Elite
2019 Ford Transit Connect Wagon (refresh)
2018 Hyundai Sonata Hybrid & PlugIn Hybrid (refresh)
2018 Lexus RC F, GS F 10th Anniversary Editions
2018 Mazda MX-5 RF (minor refresh)
2018 Nissan Titan/Titan XD with ICON Vehicle Dynamics lift kit
2019 Ram 1500 with Mopar accessories
2018 Subaru 50th Anniversary Editions (BRZ, Forester, Impreza, Legacy, Outback, WRX STI, XV)
2019 Toyota Tacoma, Tundra, 4Runner TRD Pro
2019 Volkswagen Arteon (North American debut)

Concept car introductions

 Nissan 370Zki
 Nissan Armada Snow Patrol

Race car introductions
Hyundai i30 N TCR (North American debut)

2017
The 2017 Chicago Auto Show was held from February 11 through February 20, with press days starting on February 9.

Production car introductions

 2017/2018 Chevrolet Redline Series special editions (Cruze, Malibu, Camaro, Trax, Equinox, Traverse, Colorado, Silverado)
 2017 Chrysler Pacifica BraunAbility wheelchair accessible van
 2018 Dodge Durango SRT
 2017 Mopar Dodge Challenger
 2018 Ford Expedition
 2018 Hyundai Elantra GT (North American debut)
 2017 Infiniti Q50 3.0t, QX80 Signature Edition
 2017 Jeep Wrangler Rubicon Recon
 2017 Mitsubishi Outlander Sport Limited Edition
 2017 Nissan Altima, Murano, Pathfinder, Rogue, Sentra Midnight Edition
 2017 Nissan Titan King Cab
 2017 Ram 1500 Copper Sport
 2017 Ram 2500/3500 HD Night package
 2018 Subaru Legacy (refresh)
 2018 Toyota RAV4 Adventure
 2018 Toyota Sequoia, Tundra TRD Sport

Concept car introductions

 Mercedes-Benz Metris MasterSolutions Toolbox concept van
 Nissan NV Cargo X
 2017 Nissan Titan Pro-4X Project Truck
 2018 Volkswagen Atlas Weekend Edition

2016
The 2016 Chicago Auto Show was held from February 13 through February 21, with press days starting on February 11.

Production car introductions

 2017 Chevrolet Camaro 1LE
 2016 Chevrolet Silverado/Chevrolet Colorado Midnight Editions
 2017 Chevrolet Trax (refresh)
 2016 Chrysler 200S/300S Alloy Edition
 2017 Ford Escape Sport Appearance Package
 2017 Ford Explorer BraunAbility MXV
 2017 Ford Explorer XLT Sport
 2017 Honda Ridgeline (Shown with newly released optional accessories)
 2017 Hyundai Santa Fe (refresh)
 2017 Kia Niro
 2017 Kia Optima Hybrid, Kia Optima PHEV
 2016 Mercedes-Benz Sprinter Worker
 2017 Nissan Armada
 2017 Ram Power Wagon (refresh)
 2017 Ram 2500 4x4 Off Road Package
 2016 Subaru XV Crosstrek Special Edition
 2017 Toyota Tacoma TRD Pro

Concept car introductions
 Mercedes-Benz Sprinter Extreme Concept
 Nissan Winter Warriors Concepts

2015
The 2015 Chicago Auto Show was held from February 14 through February 22 and had a 7 percent increase in attendance compared to 2014. The show's media preview day hosted 18 world premieres including the introduction of the Kia Trail'ster concept as well as production vehicles such as the Acura RDX, Chevrolet Equinox, Honda Pilot and Toyota Avalon.

Production car introductions

 2016 Acura RDX (refresh)
 2015 Chevrolet Colorado GearOn Edition
 2016 Chevrolet Equinox (refresh)
 2015 Chevrolet Silverado Custom
 2015 Chevrolet Silverado Midnight Edition
 2016 Ford Police Interceptor Utility (refresh)
 2016 Honda Pilot
 2016 Hyundai Elantra GT (refresh)
 2016 Hyundai Veloster Rally Edition
 2016 Kia Rio (refresh)
 2015 Ram 1500 Laramie Limited
 2016 Toyota Avalon (refresh)
 2016 Toyota Camry Special Edition
 2016 Toyota Corolla Special Edition

Concept car introductions

 Kia Trail'ster (e-AWD)
 2016 Mazda MX-5 accessories concept
 Mitsubishi Concept GC-PHEV (North American debut)
 Nissan 370Z NISMO Roadster

Race car introductions
 Nissan GT-R LM NISMO

2014
The 2014 Chicago Auto Show was held from February 8 through February 17, with press days starting on February 6.

Production car introductions

 2014 BMW 740Ld XDrive (U.S. introduction)
 2015 Chevrolet City Express
 2015 Chevrolet Tahoe PPV
 2014 Dodge Journey Crossroad
 2014 Hyundai Veloster RE:FLEX Edition
 2014 Kia Optima Hybrid (facelift)
 2015 Kia Soul EV
 2015 Lincoln Navigator (facelift)
 2015 Nissan Versa Note SR
 2014 SRT Satin Vapor Editions (Challenger, Charger, 300)
 2015 Subaru Legacy
 2015 TRD Pro Series (Tundra, Tacoma, 4Runner)
 Volvo S60/V60 Polestar (U.S. debut)

Concept car introductions

 Kia Niro (U.S. debut)
 Nissan Frontier Diesel Runner

Race car introductions
 Volkswagen GRC Beetle

2013
The 2013 Chicago Auto Show was held from February 9 through February 18, with press days starting on February 7.

Production car introductions

 Chevrolet Cruze Diesel
 Chrysler 300 SRT8 "Core"
 Dodge Challenger R/T Redline, 
 Dodge Challenger SRT8 "Core"
 Dodge Charger SRT8 Super Bee
 Kia Forte 5-door
 Mopar '13 Dodge Dart
 Nissan 370Z NISMO
 Nissan GT-R Track Edition
 Nissan Juke NISMO
 Nissan NV200 Cargo Van
 Ram ProMaster 3500 Cargo Van 
 Ram ProMaster 3500 Chassis Cab Cutaway
 Scion FR-S Pro/Celebrity Race
 Toyota Tundra Crew Cab 1794 Edition
 Toyota Tundra CrewMax Platinum Package
 TRD Toyota Tundra CrewMax Limited
 Volkswagen Beetle GSR
 Volkswagen Beetle Turbo Convertible R-Line
 Volkswagen GTI Driver's Edition
 Volkswagen GTI Wolfsburg Edition

Concept car introductions

 Chevrolet "Turbo" Camaro Coupe Concept 
 Dodge Charger Defiance Show Car
 Kia Cross GT Concept
 Kia Optima Hybrid "Inspired by Superman" Concept
 Ford Fiesta ST GRC Concept
 Ford Focus TrackSTer Concept

2012
The 2012 Chicago Auto Show was held from February 10 through February 19, with press days starting on February 8.

Introductions and concepts:

 2013 Acura ILX (production vehicle)
 2013 Acura RDX (production vehicle)
 2013 Chevrolet Corvette 427 Covertible
 2013 Ford Shelby GT500 Convertible
 2013 GMC Acadia
 2013 Hyundai Elantra Coupe
 2013 Hyundai Elantra GT (North American debut)
 Kia Track'ster concept
 2012 Mazda MX-5 Miata Special Edition
 2012 Mopar '12 Chrysler 300
 2013 Nissan 370Z
 2013 Nissan NV200 (North American debut)
 2012 Ram 1500 Laramie Limited
 2013 Toyota Land Cruiser (North American debut)
 2013 Volkswagen Beetle TDI

In addition to the factory-built Chrysler 300, Mopar also showed three 75th anniversary accessory kits: the Dodge Dart "GTS 210 Tribute", Fiat 500 "Stinger", and Mopar Jeep Compass "True North".

2011
The 2011 Chicago Auto Show was held from February 11 through February 20, with press days starting on February 9.

Introductions and concepts:

 2012 Acura TL
 2012 Buick Regal with eAssist
 2012 Chevrolet Camaro ZL1
 2011 Chrysler 200 Convertible
 2012 Dodge Charger SRT8
 2011 Dodge Durango Heat
 2012 Hyundai Genesis (including 5.0 R-Spec)
 Hyundai Veloster rally car
 2011 Mazda MX-5 Miata Special Edition
 2011 Ram 1500 Tradesman
 2011 Ram 3500 HD
 2012 Shelby GT350 Convertible
 2011 Toyota Matrix
 2012 Volkswagen Jetta GLI

2010
The 2010 Chicago Auto Show was held from February 12 through February 21, with press days starting on February 10.

Introductions and concepts:

2011 BMW Alpina B7 (F01)
2011 Chevrolet Silverado 2500 & 3500 HD
DeltaWing
2011 Ford Edge
2011 Ford Shelby GT 500
2011 Ford Transit Connect Electric
2011 Ford Transit Connect Taxi
2011 Honda Odyssey (concept)
2011 Hyundai Azera
Kia Ray plug-in hybrid concept
2010 Nissan 370Z 40th Anniversary Edition
2010 Scion tC RS 6.0 ("Speedway Blue")
2011 Toyota Avalon

2009
The 2009 Chicago Auto Show was held from February 13 through February 22, with press days starting on February 11.

Introductions and concepts:

2010 Acura TSX V6
Chevrolet Corvette Stingray concept
2010 Dodge Ram Heavy Duty
2010 Ford Harley-Davidson F-150
2010 Ford Taurus SHO
2010 Hyundai Genesis Coupe R-Spec
2010 Kia Forte
2009 Mazda MX-5 (North American introduction)
2010 Mitsubishi Lancer Sportback (U.S. introduction)
2009 Nissan Cube Krom
2009 Scion tC RS 5.0 ("Gloss Black")
2010 Toyota Tundra

Also, the Ford Transit Connect was re-introduced as an official 2010 model, after pre-production units were displayed for the first time in the U.S. at the previous year's show.

2008
The 2008 Chicago Auto Show was held from February 8 through February 17, with press days starting on February 6.

Introductions:

 2009 Acura RL
 2009 Chevrolet HHR Flexfuel
 2009 Chevrolet Traverse
 2008 Dodge Challenger SRT-8
 2009 Ford Edge Sport
 Ford Transit Connect (North American debut)
 GMC Denali XT concept
 2009 GMC Sierra Hybrid
 2009 Hummer H3T
 2009 Hyundai Elantra Touring (U.S. debut)
 2009 Hyundai Sonata
 2009 Mitsubishi Eclipse
 2009 Mitsubishi Galant
 2009 Porsche Cayenne GTS (North American debut)
 2008 Scion tC RS 4.0 ("Galactic Gray Mica")
 2009 Suzuki Equator
 2009 Volkswagen Routan

The show also had a special U.S. Army area, open to the public, which displayed military vehicles and featured Army-related activities and video games.

2007

The 2007 Chicago Auto Show was held from February 9 through February 18, with press days starting on the 7th.

Introductions:

 2008 BMW 5 Series (North American introduction)
 2008 Dodge Dakota
 2008 Ford Taurus (renamed from Ford Five Hundred)
 2008 Ford Taurus X (renamed from Ford Freestyle)
 Kia Rondo SX concept
 2008 Mercury Sable (renamed from Mercury Montego)
 2008 Nissan Armada
 2008 Nissan Pathfinder
 2008 Nissan Titan
 2008 Pontiac G8
 2007 Porsche 911 GT3 RS (North American introduction)
 2008 Saturn Astra
 2008 Saturn Vue Green Line
 2008 Saturn Vue Red Line
 2008 Scion xB
 2008 Scion xD
 2008 Toyota Highlander
 2008 Volkswagen R32 (North American introduction)

2006

The 2006 Chicago Auto Show was held from February 10 through February 19, with press days starting on the 8th.

Introductions:

 2007 Bentley Continental GTC convertible
 2007 Chevrolet Avalanche
 2006 Chevrolet Kodiak C4500 (Special Modification)
 2007 Dodge Caliber SRT-4
 2007 Dodge Charger Super Bee
 2007 Dodge Nitro
 Dodge Rampage Concept (front wheel drive pickup)
 2007 Ford Expedition
 2007 Hyundai Entourage
 2006 Hyundai Accent 3-door
 2007 International MXT
 2007 International RXT
 2007 Lexus ES 350
 2007 Lincoln Navigator/Navigator L
 2007 Lincoln MKZ (formerly the Lincoln Zephyr)
 2007 Mercedes-Benz R63 AMG
 2007 Mitsubishi Galant Ralliart
 2007 Nissan Quest
 2007 Subaru B9 Tribeca
 2007 Toyota Tundra
 2007 Volkswagen Rabbit

2005

The 2005 Chicago Auto Show was held from February 11 through February 20, with press days starting on the 9th.

Production car introductions

 2006 Buick Lucerne
 2006 Cadillac DTS
 2006 Dodge Ram Mega Cab
 2006 Hummer H3
 2006 Kia Sedona
 2006 Mercedes-Benz S65 AMG
 2006 Mercury Milan
 2006 Mercury Mountaineer
 2006 Mercury Mariner Hybrid
 2006 Suzuki Grand Vitara
 2007 Toyota FJ Cruiser

Concept car introductions
 Dodge Nitro (concept)
 Honda Civic Si coupe (pre-production concept)
 Hyundai Portico

2003

The 2003 Chicago Auto Show was held from February 14 through February 23.

Introductions:
 2004 Chevrolet Aveo
 2004 Ford Freestar
 2004 Mercury Monterey
 2004 Suzuki Forenza
 2004 Suzuki Verona

2002

The 2002 Chicago Auto Show was held from February 8 through February 17.

Introductions:
 2003 Kia Sorento
 2003 Mercury Marauder

2001
Introductions: 
 2002 Nissan Xterra 
 2002 Subaru Impreza Outback Sport
 Hyundai HCD6 Roadster Concept Car
Toyota RSC concept

1998

Production car introductions

 Acura 3.5 RL Special Edition
 Acura Integra Type-R SCCA Race Car
 Acura NSX SCCA Race Car
 Cadillac Seville
 Chevrolet Corvette Convertible
 Chevrolet Tahoe Z71
 Chevrolet TrailBlazer
 Chrysler Town & Country Limited
 Dodge Viper GTS-R GT2 Championship Edition
 Jeep Grand Cherokee 5.9 Limited
 Jeep Cherokee Classic
 Mitsubishi Galant
 Nissan Quest
 Kia Sportage Convertible
 Ford SVT F-150 Lightning
 Ford F-150 NASCAR Special Edition
 Ford SVT Mustang Cobra Bondurant
 Ford Ranger XLT 4x4 Supercab
 Toyota Corolla Sedan
 Toyota Land Cruiser
 Toyota Tacoma Xtracab
 Subaru Legacy 2.5GT Limited

Concept car introductions

 Pontiac Grand Prix Concept:Cure by Cynthia Rowley
 Cadillac DeVille Concours Concept:Cure by Michael Kors
 Chevrolet Venture Concept:Cure by Joe Boxer's Nicholas Graham
 GMC Jimmy Concept:Cure by Tommy Hilfiger
 GMC Sierra DEUCE
 Ford Libre
 Nissan Frontier 4-door Concept 
 Infiniti Q29 Roadster
 Kia Minivan Concept
 Toyota T150 Concept

1997

 Ford Powerforce

1995 

 Buick XP2000

1992
More than 1,000 vehicles were on display, from the automotive manufacturers and other groups.

Production car introductions

 Audi 90
 Buick Skylark Sedan
 Ford Escort GT
 Ford SVT Mustang Cobra
 Ford SVT F-150 Lightning
 Infiniti J30
 Mazda 626
 Mercury Tracer
 Subaru Legacy Touring Sports LE Wagon
 Toyota Camry Wagon

Concept car introductions
 Geo Tracker concepts (Back Packer, Beach Low-Rider, Baja Race, Biker, Snow)
 Ford Explorer Drifter
 Ford Boss Bronco
 Saab 9000CD Turbo Flex Fuel Concept
 Toyota Avalon 4-door convertible concept

1991
 GMC Rio Grande All-Wheel-Drive Concept

1990

Production car introductions
 Vector W8

Concept cars

 Cadillac Aurora
 Dodge Daytona R/T concept
 Dodge Viper RT/10 concept
 Eagle Optima
 Geo "California Concept" Storm
 GMC Mahalo
 Geo Tracker "Hugger"
 GMC Transcend
 Plymouth Voyager III
 Subaru SRD-1
 Subaru SV/X concept

1989
The 1989 Chicago Auto Show featured the debut of the Acura NS-X sports car concept, which would lead to the production NSX in 1990.

The 1989 Chicago Auto Show featured the debut of the 1989 Syclone concept sports pickup, which would lead to the production of the GMC Syclone in 1991.

1968

Production car introductions
 AMC AMX

1923

Production car introductions
 Crossland Steam Car

References

External links
 Chicago Auto Show
 Chicago Automobile Trade Association
 

Festivals in Chicago
Auto shows in the United States
Recurring events established in 1901
1901 establishments in Illinois